Trogen is a municipality in Upper Franconia in the district of Hof in Bavaria in Germany.

Geography
Trogen is nestled between hills in a valley.
The Town is located about six kilometers northeast of the county seat Hof (Saale) on the Bundesautobahn 72 (junction 3 Hof / Töpen), and  Bundesautobahn 93 (junction 2 Hof-East) and the federal highway B173. 
The community is located in the Bavarian part of Vogtland. It is part of the district of Hof and thus also of the administrative region of Upper Franconia (Oberfranken). 
The neighboring village Feilitzsch is only a few hundred meters away from Trogen.

History
The first documentary mention of Trogen dates from December 21, 1306. The later Margrave of Kulmbach-Bayreuth were since 1373 rulers in Trogen.
In Trogen were three knight seats (Wasserburg, Trogen-Zech, Oberes Gut) were in the possession of the Counts of Reuss (Imperial County of Reuss), the Margrave of Kulmbach-Bayreuth and Kursachsen (Electorate of Saxony).
As a part of the 1792 Prussian Principality of Bayreuth Trogen fell in the Treaties of Tilsit in 1807 to France and came in 1810 to Bavaria. As part of the administrative reforms in Bavaria, the municipality of today was founded with the community edict of 1818.

Sports
The towns association football club, 1. FC Trogen, experienced its greatest success in 2012 when it won promotion to the northern division of the Bayernliga but lasted for only one season at this level.

Education
Trogen has since 1999 a Kindergarten with 100 seats for children.

Volunteer fire department

Trogen has its own volunteer firefighters. This department has 146 members, approx. 45 of them are active. 4 vehicles are held by this institution.

Coat of arms
The Trogener Coat of Arms dates from 1979.
Blazon: Above silver Zinnenschildfuß in black a growing red-armored and crowned golden lion holding in his forelegs a shield divided by silver, red and black.
The three pinnacles symbolize the three knight seats (Wasserburg, Trogen-Zech, and Oberes Gut). The lion stands as a symbol of the former governors of Weida. 
The shield comes from the coat of arms of the barons of Feilitzsch.

References

Hof (district)